Andrew George Dillin is a Howard Hughes Medical Investigator and the Thomas and Stacey Siebel Distinguished Chair in Stem Cell Research at the Department of Molecular and Cell Biology at Berkeley. His lab studies the loss of protein homeostasis in aging, particularly in Caenorhabditis elegans.

His lab specifically looks at the manipulation of stress response pathways, such as the heat shock response and the unfolded protein response of the mitochondria and the endoplasmic reticulum. In particular, his lab found a cell non-autonomous mitochondrial stress response that can be transmitted to distal cells.

References

External links
Lab Website

Living people
University of California, Berkeley College of Letters and Science faculty
Howard Hughes Medical Investigators
Year of birth missing (living people)
Place of birth missing (living people)
21st-century American biologists